Cearbhall Ó Dálaigh (12 February 1911 – 21 March 1978) was an Irish Fianna Fáil politician, judge and barrister who served as the fifth president of Ireland from December 1974 to October 1976.

His birth name was registered in English as Carroll O'Daly, which he used during his legal career and which is recorded by some publications.

He served as a Judge of the European Court of Justice from 1973 to 1974, Chief Justice of Ireland from 1961 to 1973, a Judge of the Supreme Court from 1953 to 1973, and Attorney General of Ireland from 1946 to 1948 and from 1951 to 1953.

Early life
Cearbhall Ó Dálaigh, one of four children, was born on 12 February 1911, in Bray, County Wicklow. His father, Richard O'Daly, was a fishmonger with little interest in politics. His mother was Una Thornton.

Ó Dálaigh had an elder brother, Aonghus, and two younger sisters, Úna and Nuala. He went to St. Cronan's Boys National School, and later to Synge Street CBS in Dublin. While attending University College Dublin, he became auditor of An Cumann Gaelach and of the Literary and Historical Society. He also became Irish language editor of The Irish Press.

Career
A graduate of University College Dublin, Ó Dálaigh was a committed Fianna Fáil supporter who served on the party's National Executive in the 1930s; he became Ireland's youngest Attorney General in 1946, under Taoiseach Éamon de Valera, serving until 1948. Unsuccessful in Dáil and Seanad elections in 1948 and 1951, he was re-appointed as Attorney General of Ireland in 1951. In 1953, he was nominated as the youngest-ever member of the Supreme Court by his mentor, de Valera. Less than a decade later, he became Chief Justice of Ireland, on the nomination of Taoiseach Seán Lemass. He was a keen actor in his early years, and became a close friend of actor Cyril Cusack. It is commonly stated that Ó Dálaigh and Cusack picketed the Dublin launch of Disney's Darby O'Gill and the Little People in 1959, for what they felt was the film's stereotyping of Irish people. However, there is no known contemporary reference to this having occurred.

He was an opponent of the US bombing of North Vietnam.

In 1972, Taoiseach Jack Lynch suggested to the opposition parties that they agree to nominate Ó Dálaigh to become President of Ireland when President de Valera's second term ended in June of the following year. Fine Gael, confident that its prospective candidate Tom O'Higgins would win the 1973 presidential election (he had almost defeated de Valera in 1966), turned down the offer. Fianna Fáil's Erskine H. Childers went on to win the election that followed.

When Ireland joined the European Economic Community, Lynch appointed Ó Dálaigh as Ireland's judge on the European Court of Justice. When President Childers died suddenly in 1974, all parties agreed to nominate Ó Dálaigh to replace him.

President of Ireland
Ó Dálaigh's tenure as president proved to be contentious. While popular with Irish language speakers and with artists, and respected by many republicans, he had a strained relationship with the then government, particularly with Minister Conor Cruise O'Brien and Taoiseach Liam Cosgrave.

His decision, in 1976, to exercise his power to refer a bill to the Supreme Court to test its constitutionality brought him into conflict with the Fine Gael-Labour National Coalition. Following the assassination of the British Ambassador, Christopher Ewart-Biggs, by the Provisional Irish Republican Army (IRA), on 23 July 1976, the government announced its intention to introduce legislation extending the maximum period of detention without charge from two to seven days.

Ó Dálaigh referred the resulting bill, the Emergency Powers Bill, to the Supreme Court. When the court ruled that the bill was constitutional, he signed the bill into law on 16 October 1976. On the same day, an IRA bomb in Mountmellick killed Michael Clerkin, a member of the Garda Síochána, the country's police force. Ó Dálaigh's actions were seen by government ministers to have contributed to the killing of this Garda. On the following day, Minister for Defence Paddy Donegan, visiting a barracks in Mullingar to open a canteen, attacked the President for sending the bill to the Supreme Court, calling him a "thundering disgrace" (or possibly "fucking disgrace" or "thundering bollocks").

Ó Dálaigh's private papers show that he considered the relationship between the President (as Commander-in-Chief of the Defence Forces) and the Minister for Defence had been "irrevocably broken" by the comments of the Minister in front of the army Chief of Staff and other high-ranking officers. Donegan offered his resignation, but Taoiseach Liam Cosgrave refused to accept it. This proved the last straw for Ó Dálaigh, who believed that Cosgrave had additionally failed to meet his constitutional obligation to regularly brief the President. He resigned from the presidency on 22 October 1976, "to protect the dignity and independence of the presidency as an institution". He was succeeded as President of Ireland by Patrick Hillery.

Death
Ó Dálaigh died of a heart attack in 1978, less than two years after resigning the presidency. He is buried in Sneem, County Kerry.

See also
List of members of the European Court of Justice

References

External links
 
 UCD archives

1911 births
1978 deaths
Alumni of University College Dublin
Attorneys General of Ireland
Auditors of the Literary and Historical Society (University College Dublin)
Chief justices of Ireland
European Court of Justice judges
Fianna Fáil politicians
Irish judges of international courts and tribunals
Irish-language writers
Irish newspaper editors
People educated at Synge Street CBS
People from Bray, County Wicklow
Presidents of Ireland
The Irish Press people
20th-century Irish lawyers
Alumni of King's Inns